Harbortown is a planned community neighborhood in  Perth Amboy in Middlesex County, New Jersey, United States. It is situated south of the Outerbridge Crossing along the Arthur Kill, between the city's traditional waterfront and the Kinder Morgan terminal The 135-acre area was the Lehigh Valley Railroad's (LVRR) Easton and Amboy Railroad's marshaling yards where coal was loaded onto barges until the LVRR's bankruptcy in 1976.

See also
Neighborhoods in Perth Amboy, New Jersey

References

Neighborhoods in Perth Amboy, New Jersey